Northwich Motive Power Depot was a traction maintenance depot located in Northwich, Cheshire, England. The depot was situated on the Mid-Cheshire line and was located immediately to the southeast of Northwich station.

The depot code was latterly NW.

History 
Before its closure in 1984, Class 08 shunters, Class 25 and 40 locomotives could be seen at the depot.

References 

 Railway depots in England
Rail transport in Cheshire
Northwich